This is a list of electoral results for the Waverley Province in Victorian state elections.

Members for Waverley Province

 Vliet died 16 October 1982

Election results

Elections in the 2000s

Elections in the 1990s

Elections in the 1980s

 This by-election was caused by the death of Tony Van Vliet. Two party preferred vote was estimated.

Elections in the 1970s

References

Victoria (Australia) state electoral results by district